Here Comes Shuggie Otis  is the first album by Shuggie Otis. It was released in 1970 on Epic Records.

Track listing

Personnel
Musicians
Shuggie Otis – lead and backing vocals, guitar, piano, harpsichord, organ, celesta
Johnny Otis – piano, harpsichord, celesta, timpani, percussion
Wilton Felder – bass, harpsichord, celesta
Stix Hooper, Abe Mills, Paul Lagos – drums
Leon Haywood – organ
Ray Johnson – piano
Al McKibbon – string bass
Bob Mitchell, Melvin Moore – trumpet
Gene "Mighty Flea" Conners – trombone
Richard Mackey, Willie Ruff – French horn
Hyman Gold, Irving Lipschultz – cello
Marilyn Baker, Rollice Dale – violin
Jim Horn, Plas Johnson, Preston Love, Hank Jernigan, Jack Kelso – saxophone
Eunice Wennermark, Ginger Smock, Isadore Roman, Joe Lichter – strings
Preston Love, Jack Kelso, Hank Jernigan – flute

Other personnel
 Rafael O. Valentin – engineer
 Pete Welding – liner notes

References

External links
 Shuggie Otis-Here Comes Shuggie Otis at Discogs

1970 debut albums
Shuggie Otis albums
Epic Records albums
Albums produced by Johnny Otis